Ugento is a town and comune in the province of Lecce, Apulia, southern Italy. It has a small harbour on the Gulf of Taranto of the Ionian Sea.

History

The city is the ancient Uxentum, and claims to have been founded by Uxens, who is mentioned in the Eighth Book of the Aeneid. In ancient times it was an important city. In 1537 it was sacked by the Turks. Under Byzantine domination it had Greek bishops.

Economy

Economy is mostly based on agriculture (wine and olives), fishing, shepherding, food processing and tourism.

References

Localities of Salento
Coastal towns in Apulia